Amsterdam Publishers is the largest publisher of Holocaust memoirs in Europe. It was founded in 2012 by Dutch art historian Liesbeth Heenk. Since 2019 it focuses on Holocaust-related literature.

History 
Amsterdam Publishers started publishing ebooks on art in 2012. One of their earliest releases was an ebook on Rembrandt etchings, and accompanied an exhibition on Rembrandt at the Teylers museum in Haarlem in 2013. It was the first time a digital publication accompanied an exhibition. In 2015, the imprint started running self-publishing workshops, which was later accompanied by an instructional handbook published in Dutch.

Amsterdam Publishers added their first non-art titles in 2014. Manny Steinberg’s Outcry – Holocaust Memoirs was an early commercial success. Since 2019, the publisher has focused exclusively on Holocaust Memoirs. The founder, Liesbeth Heenk, has stated that the mission of the imprint is to fight anti-Semitism and Holocaust denial.

Amsterdam Publishers is one of the few international publishing houses based in the Netherlands. Its authors are international (mainly from the US), and books are (being) published in English, Albanian, Czech, Dutch, Hebrew, Sinhalese, French, German, Italian, Spanish, Polish, Romanian, Slovak, Ukrainian, Chinese and Japanese. 

On the occasion of the 10-year anniversary of the publishing house, the Consulate of the Kingdom of the Netherlands in New York hosted an Amsterdam Publishers authors event on 12 September 2022. In November 2022, a 7-day booktour in Albania and Kosovo took place to promote Dr Anna Kohen's Flower of Vlora in the Albanian language, Lulja e Vlorës.

Liesbeth Heenk on her motivation to publish stories of the Holocaust: 

My motivation is connected to a sense of injustice. It most likely started with my mother telling me and my siblings at the dinner table how she, as a young girl, used to carry pamphlets in her bike for the Dutch resistance. One doesn’t realize the significance of these things until much later. On a deeper level, I feel a strong need to do something meaningful, to change the world as much as an individual is capable of changing the world.

Bibliography 
Holocaust Library

Amsterdam Publishers specialises in memoirs by Holocaust survivors, Second Generation survivors and Third Generation survivors. These include memoirs by Manny Steinberg, Joseph Schupack, Janina Altman, Hank Brodt, Nanette Blitz Konig, Natalie Hess, Walter Leopold, Paul Davidovits, Salo Muller, Robert Krell, Leon Kleiner, Halina Kleiner, Sara Lustigman Omelinksi, Jan Yohay Remetz, Roman Halter, Elmar Rivosh and Leokadia Schmidt. Their memoirs are part of the series Holocaust Survivor Memoirs WWII. Many of these survivors can be found on this List of Holocaust survivors.

Memoirs by second and third generation survivors include Adena Bernstein Astrowsky, Evelyn Joseph Grossman, Fred Feldman, Ronny Hein, Zvi Wiesenfeld, Laura Beth Bakst, Nechama Birnbaum, Martin Bodek, Barbara Gilford, Anna Kohen, Ira Wesley Kitmacher, Max Friedman, Mark Prelas, Robert Wolf, Tammy Bottner, Ron Vincent, Ettie Zilber, and Emanuel Rosen. These publications can all be found in the series Holocaust Survivor True Stories WWII. The series Jewish Children in the Holocaust contains the stories written by children who have been hidden in Holland and Belgium during the Second World War, with books by Robert Krell, Joseph Gosler, Salo Muller and Agnes Schipper. In 2021, the publishing house added a series of New Jewish Fiction which includes novels by Annette Libeskind Berkovits, Ruth Rotkowitz, and Casey Hayes. A new series Holocaust Books for Young Adults has been added in 2022, featuring Running for Shelter, written by Suzette Sheft (2006) who started writing the true story of her grandmother at age 13.  

Amsterdam Publishers has also published the memoirs of Omar Ndizeye and of Hyppolite Ntigurirwa, which detail their experiences of the Rwandan genocide. This topic has since been abandoned, in order to fully concentrate on Holocaust stories and Jewish literature.

References 

Book publishing companies of the Netherlands